Michael Edward Stoyanov (born December 14, 1966) is an American actor and writer.

Biography
Stoyanov was born in Chicago, Illinois. He is of Bulgarian and Ukrainian descent. He is best known for his role in the situation comedy Blossom as eldest sibling Anthony "Tony" Russo. He left the show during the show's final season to write for Late Night with Conan O'Brien, a move he later said he regretted.

Stoyanov left Late Night within a year and went on to briefly write for Mad TV and Mr. Show. Stoyanov trained with the Chicago improvisational group Second City. He also guest starred in the second season Quantum Leap episode "Another Mother", as Kevin Buckner, an aspiring teenage comedian who is kidnapped. He had a cameo as “Dopey,” one of the Joker's goons in the opening scene of the 2008 film The Dark Knight.

Select filmography

Big Shots (1987)
Out on the Edge (1989) (TV)
Gross Anatomy (1989)
Married... with Children  (1990) (TV) as Pizza Boy - episode – "You Gotta Know When to Hold 'Em:" Part 1
Exile (1990) (TV)
Quantum Leap  (1991) (TV) as Kevin Bruckner - episode – "Another Mother"
Blossom (1991-1995) as Anthony Russo, main cast
Mom and Dad Save the World (1992)
Without Warning:  Terror in the Towers (1993) (TV)
Freaked (1993)
Late Night with Conan O'Brien (1994–1997), writer, 10 episodes
Mr. Show with Bob and David (1997), writer, 5 episodes
Beverly Hills 90210 (1996) – Jimmy Gold on episodes "Mate for Life" and "Disappearing Act".
The Dana Carvey Show (1996) writer, full series
Almost Forever (1996) (TV)
Chicago Sons (1997) (TV series)
Restaurant (1998)
Mr. Show and the Incredible, Fantastical News Report (1998), writer, TV movie
MADtv (1999–2000) (writer, season 5)
Safe Harbor (1999) (TV series)
Girls Will Be Girls (2003)
Prison Break (2005) (TV series)
The Dark Knight (2008)
The Mentalist: Scarlet Fever (2009) (TV series)
Justified (2013) (TV Series)
Space Station 76 (2014)
Gotham (2016) (TV Series)
Kingdom (2016) (TV Series)
Billions (2017-2020) (TV Series)
Red Dead Redemption 2 (2018) (Videogame)
Call Me Kat (2022) – Himself

References

External links
 
 

1970 births
Living people
Male actors from Chicago
American male film actors
American male television actors
American television writers
American male television writers
American people of Bulgarian descent
American people of Ukrainian descent
Screenwriters from Illinois